Thierry Paulin (November 28, 1963 – April 16, 1989), known as The Monster of Montmartre, was a French serial killer active in the 1980s who murdered 21 elderly women. He died from complications related to AIDS before his trial.

Childhood and teenage years
Paulin was born in Fort-de-France, Martinique. His father flew to metropolitan France just after his birth, leaving his teenaged mother to fend for herself and the baby. Paulin was raised in Martinique by his paternal grandmother, who owned a restaurant and allegedly paid little attention to her grandson. When he was ten, Paulin started to live with his now married mother, trying to blend in with his stepbrothers and sisters. His behavior started to become erratic and violent towards the other children, and eventually his mother asked his father to take their son to metropolitan France. His father accepted in order to avoid paying alimony.

As a mixed-race student among white peers, Paulin had few friends, and performed poorly at school, failing his exams. At the age of 17, he decided to enter military service early, joining the parachutists' troops; however, his fellow soldiers disdained him for his race and homosexuality.

On 14 November 1982, he robbed an old woman in her grocery, menacing her with a knife; the grocer knew him as a customer, however, and he was soon arrested. In June 1983, he was sentenced to two years in prison, but the sentence was suspended ("avec sursis"), allowing Paulin to remain free.

From Toulouse to Paris
In 1984, after leaving the army, Paulin learned that his mother and her family now lived in Nanterre, a western suburb of Paris. He went there to live with them, but his relationship was hostile.

Paulin became a waiter at the Paradis Latin, a nightclub renowned for its drag shows. There, he started a career as an artist, dressed in drag and singing tunes by his favourite singer, Eartha Kitt. His mother was once invited to watch her son's performance, but she left the club a few seconds after the beginning of the act.

The most important event that happened to Paulin at the Paradis Latin was meeting Jean-Thierry Mathurin. The 19-year-old Mathurin was born in French Guiana, and was a drug addict. Paulin fell in love with him and they soon became lovers. Paulin was also addicted, but less severely, and sold drugs as well.

On October 5, 1984, two elderly women were assaulted in Paris. Germaine Petitot, 91, survived but was too traumatized to give a detailed description of the criminals. Anna Barbier-Ponthus, 83, died after being beaten and asphyxiated beneath a pillow. Her murderer robbed her of 300 francs (about $50).

In October–November 1984, eight other old women were murdered, mainly in the 18th arrondissement of Paris, but in neighboring areas too. The violence of the crimes was notable; some of the victims had their heads stuck into plastic bags, some were beaten to death, and one of them was forced to drink drain cleaner. In all cases, the motive appeared to be robbery. Some reports allege that Paulin singled out women who seemed unpleasant or unfriendly when he engaged them in conversation, while Paulin himself told police that "I only tackled the weakest of them."

At the same time, Paulin and Mathurin were leading an extravagant lifestyle, spending their nights dancing, drinking champagne, and snorting cocaine. In late November, they decided to go to Toulouse to stay for a few months at the home of Paulin's father. But the elder Paulin was unable to accept his son's lover, and violent fights ensued, ending when Paulin and Mathurin broke up. Mathurin returned to Paris, while Paulin tried to start his own firm of transvestite artists, a plan which failed in autumn 1985.

The second wave of murders
From December 20, 1985, to June 14, 1986, eight more old women were murdered. The police were unable to identify the killer, though the investigators had a few clues. Police determined through fingerprint evidence that the perpetrator was the same individual who committed the 1984 murders. However, in the new murders, the killer appeared to favor quicker, less cruel methods.

In the autumn of 1986, Paulin attacked one of his cocaine dealers with a baseball bat. The dealer went to the police, and Paulin was arrested. Paulin was sentenced to 16 months of jail for the assault, spending one year in Fresnes Prison. Upon his release, Paulin knew himself to be HIV-positive. However, this just increased the number of killings in what seemed like a race against time to kill as many as possible, as he knew he was on his last years.

The final countdown
Knowing that he was in effect under a death sentence from AIDS, Paulin organized lavish parties, spending a lot of money and sparing no expense. Paulin paid for these parties with stolen credit cards and checks, and with the proceeds from his murders.

On November 25, 1987, Paulin murdered Rachel Cohen, age 79. On the same day, he attacked an 87-year-old woman, Berthe Finalteri, whom he suffocated and left for dead. Two days later, he strangled Geneviève Germont, who would be his last victim.

As Paulin celebrated his 24th birthday, Finalteri unexpectedly recovered, and was able to give an accurate description of her attacker, stating that he was "un métis d'une vingtaine d'années coiffé à la Carl Lewis, avec une boucle d'oreille à l'oreille gauche" (literally "a mix-race man in his twenties, with hair like Carl Lewis and an earring in his left ear"). On December 1, Paulin was arrested while walking down the street when a local police inspector, Francis Jacob, recognized him from Finalteri's description. After two days in custody, Paulin admitted everything, including his involvement with Mathurin. Accused of committing 18 murders (though he claimed responsibility for 21), he was sent to jail awaiting trial.

In early 1988, Paulin fell ill, as his body began to succumb to the effects of AIDS. Within a year he was hospitalized in a state of near-paralysis, suffering from both tuberculosis and meningitis. He died during the night of April 16, 1989 in the hospital wing of Fresnes Prison.

Only Mathurin was tried for the first nine attacks and murders, receiving a life sentence, plus 18 years without parole, but he was released in 2012. He was incarcerated until January 2009, while technically, Thierry Paulin was never convicted of the murders of which he was accused.

Film references
The 1994 movie J'ai pas sommeil (I Can't Sleep) by director Claire Denis was based on the Paulin case.

Bibliography
VKY, "Thierry Paulin: Une Tragédie Noire", Editions Canaan, Paris, 2022

See also
Jacques Coetzee - a fellow drag performer who also committed murders with an accomplice
List of French serial killers
List of serial killers by number of victims

References

External links
  Paulin, Thierry (biographical notes)

1963 births
1989 deaths
20th-century French criminals
20th-century French LGBT people
AIDS-related deaths in France
French drag queens
French male criminals
French people of Martiniquais descent
French people who died in prison custody
French serial killers
Male serial killers
People from Fort-de-France
Prisoners who died in French detention
Serial killers who died in prison custody